The Justice Forum (commonly referred to as JEEMA) is a political party in Uganda. The party was originally established as a pressure group in 1995 under the one-party system of the National Resistance Movement, as other political parties were not allowed until after the 2005 constitutional referendum. JEEMA has been participating in Uganda’s electoral politics and has fielded candidates at the presidential, parliamentary and local council levels since 1996. In 1996 and 2001, Kibirige Muhamad Mayanja, the first JEEMA party leader, contested for the Presidency of Uganda, and since then, the party has been represented in Uganda’s National Assembly. Currently, it is one of the five parties with representation in the 10th parliament and local governments. JEEMA’s first National Delegates Conference was held on 28 March 2004 at Kolping Hotel in Mityana, which saw the coming into force of the first party constitution, and the party was formally registered on 23 March 2005 after the referendum that re-instated a multi-party system in Uganda.

Kibirige Muhamad Mayanja, who led the party from its inception in 1995, relinquished power to 33-year-old lawyer Asuman Basalirwa in 2010 at the party’s second Delegates Conference that was held at Tal Cottages in Rubaga. With Basalirwa at the helm of JEEMA, it marked the start of a carefully managed transition from the founding members to the new, young generation that have since occupied almost all senior positions of the party. 

JEEMA places significant importance on civil rights and justice, as well as constitutionalism, and the party tends to be the most popular among the country's minority Muslim population.

Origin of the name and symbols 
The Justice Forum party, commonly known as JEEMA, was born out of its five cardinal principal goals:

 Justice for all,
 Education for all,
 Economic revitalization,
 Morality, and
 African Unity

The five principals became the acronym of the party which is more easily pronounceable, and is used as the party slogan.

The party emblem and campaign sign is an index finger and thumb in a “V” shape, and the party motto is "justice for all."

Ideology 
JEEMA defines itself as a "social justice and welfare party," and declines to label itself as capitalist, communist, or socialist.

JEEMA is in favour of free essential social services (like health and education) to all citizens, moral and ethical conduct in government and politics, a free but regulated market to avoid unchecked capitalist exploitation, and pursues a "people first" concept of development, where all matters affecting the nation should be decided through grassroots consultation. JEEMA stands for full dignity and respect to women, religions, races and ethnicities among other social groupings people identify with, and total respect and dignity to all nations of the world with no nation superior to another.

The party supports a transition to proportional representation and the Westminster system at the national level, saying that Uganda has never had an election that has not been disputed by other players in the race and that the first-past-the-post voting system promotes more focus on an individual's personal beliefs rather than that of their constituents, which is a recipe for corruption.

References

1995 establishments in Uganda
Political parties established in 1995
Political parties in Uganda